Melianthus comosus, the honey flower, is a species of flowering plant in the family Francoaceae. It is native to the mostly dry regions of southern Africa. The attractive multi-stemmed shrubs are popular garden subjects. The Afrikaans name kruidjie-roer-my-nie (herb-touch-me-not) alludes to the unpleasant smell that results from bruising of any part of the plant. The vegetative parts are very toxic, as with other Melianthus species, and extracts of the leaves and stem have anti-bacterial properties.

Range
It is native to South Africa, western Lesotho and southern Namibia, where it occurs from 400 to 2,000 m above sea level. In South Africa it occurs in the greater part of the Cape and Free State provinces, and locally in North West, Gauteng and Mpumalanga.

Flowers
The flowers which produce copious  black nectar are zygomorphic in shape, and green to pale pink in colour. The black nectar is visible through the pale green, semi-transparent sepals. A flower produces an average of 42 μl of nectar a day, with a 10% sugar content, which has been described as a "rich black honey" that almost fills the cup. Vahl's description of the species in 1794 however omitted any mention of the coloured nectar, or its abundance.

Uses and species associations
Honey from its flowers is dark in colour, and apparently not toxic to humans. The flowers are visited by insects and birds, especially sunbirds which eagerly seek them out.

Notes

References

Flora of South Africa
Francoaceae
Plants described in 1794
Taxa named by Martin Vahl